Al-Sijistani refers to people from the historic Sijistan region in present-day Sistan, the border region of eastern Iran and southwestern Afghanistan.

Prominent people who have been called Al-Sijistani include:

 Abu Da'ud Sulayman ibn Ash`ath al-Azadi al-Sijistani (817-888 CE), ("Abu Dawūd"), collector of hadith
 Abu Yaqub Sijistani (died c. 971 CE), Neoplatonist and Ismaili missionary
 Abu Sulayman Muhammad al-Sijistani (c. 932 - c. 1000 CE), Islamic philosopher, flourished in Baghdad
 Al-Sijzi (c. 945 - c. 1020 CE), mathematician and astronomer
 Masʽud ibn Muhammad Sijzi, 14th-century Persian physician

Surnames
Nisbas
People from Sistan
Ethnonymic surnames
Arabic-language surnames
Persian-language surnames